Guo Song (born 22 January 1993) is a Chinese professional footballer who currently plays as a midfielder for Guangxi Pingguo Haliao.

Club career
Guo Song started his professional football career in 2012 when he joined Hebei Youth for the 2012 China League Two campaign. Failing to join Hebei Zhongji, he moved to another China League One club Shijiazhuang Ever Bright in 2013. On 23 August 2015, Guo made his debut for Shijiazhuang in the 2015 Chinese Super League against Chongqing Lifan, coming on as a substitute for Li Chao in the 94th minute. On 15 September 2015, Guo was loaned to Campeonato Nacional de Seniores side . Guo scored his first senior goal on 11 March 2017 in a 2–1 win against Yunnan Lijiang.

Career statistics 
Statistics accurate as of match played 31 December 2020.

References

External links
 

1993 births
Living people
Chinese footballers
Footballers from Hebei
Cangzhou Mighty Lions F.C. players
Chinese Super League players
China League One players
Association football midfielders
Chinese expatriate footballers
Expatriate footballers in Portugal
Chinese expatriate sportspeople in Portugal
Guangxi Pingguo Haliao F.C. players
21st-century Chinese people